Downed may refer to:

Downed (animal), an animal unable to stand
"Downed", a song by Cheap Trick from the album In Color

See also
Downed opponent, in combat sports
Down (disambiguation)